

Za 
Zabilje (municipality Vitez), Zabor, Zabrđani, Zabrđe (municipality Kiseljak), Zabrđe, Zabus,  Začula (municipality Ravno), Zagorice, Zagorje, Zagradinje (municipality Ravno), Zagrađe (municipality Travnik), Zahum (municipality Prozor-Rama), Zakalje, Zanesovići (municipality Bugojno), Zapeće (municipality Dobretići), Zaplanik (municipality Ravno), Zapljevac, Zarače (municipality Busovača), Zasavica (municipality Dobretići), Zaselje (municipality Travnik), Zaselje (municipality Vitez), Zaslivlje, Zastinje (municipality Uskoplje), Zavala (municipality Ravno), Zavelim, Zavidovići, Završje, Završje (municipality Kiseljak)

Zd 
Zdaljevac (municipality Jajce)

Ze 
Zebina Šuma, Zemegresi, Zenepići (municipality Novi Travnik), Zenica

Zi 
Zidine

Zl 
Zlate, Zlavast (municipality Bugojno), Zlokuće (municipality Bugojno)

Zo 
Zorlaci, Zorovići

Zu 
Zubići (municipality Novi Travnik) Zubovići (municipality Dobretići), Zubovići, Zubovići u Oglečevi, Zukići, Zupčići

Zv 
Zvirići, Zvirovići, Zvizd (municipality Kreševo)

Lists of settlements in the Federation of Bosnia and Herzegovina (A-Ž)